The Guards Fusilier Regiment  or Guards Fusiliers was an infantry unit of the Guards Corps of the Prussian Army garrisoned in Berlin. In keeping with the genteel nature of the unit, most of its officer corps were nobility. At the time of the German Empire it commanded soldiers guarding the Wache.

History 
In 1826 the Guards Reserve Infantry (Landwehr) Regiment (Garde-Reserve-Infanterie (Landwehr) Regiment) was founded. In 1851 it was renamed the Guards Reserve Infantry Regiment (Garde-Reserve-Infanterie-Regiment) and, as part of the 1860 expansion of the army under Roonsch, given the name of Guards Fusilier Regiment (Garde-Füsilier-Regiment). The regimental staff and the Ist Battalion were initially based in Potsdam, whilst the IInd Battalion were stationed in Spandau. From 1851 to 1918 the whole regiment was moved to a garrison in Maykäfer Barracks in Berlin.

Austro-Prussian War 
In 1866 it fought in the Austro-Prussian War at the Battle of Königinhof and Battle of Königgrätz.

Franco-Prussian War 
In the 1870/71 war against France the regiment participated at Gravelotte and Sedan as well as the Siege of Paris.

First World War 

At the onset of the First World War the regiment was mobilised and was assigned to the newly formed 6th Guards Infantry Brigade of the 3rd Guards Division. The unit remained in this formation for the course of the war. Initially the fusiliers took part in the invasion of neutral Belgium and were involved in the capture of Namur. They were then deployed to the Eastern Front and fought there in the Battle of the Masurian Lakes. After suffering heavy losses at Brzeziny the remaining members of the regiment had to be gathered into a battalion. On 1 December the unit was regrouped into 2 battalions of 3 companies each. From 22 December the battalions were reorganised into four companies each. In January 1915 the IIIrd Battalion was reformed and the regiment redeployed at the end of that month to the Carpathians. They took part in the months that followed in trench warfare at Zwinin, the ridge finally being taken in April. After further fighting on the Eastern Front the regiment was sent to the West in April 1916, taking part in trench warfare in the Champagne and on the Yser, and participating in the  Battle of the Somme. From September to November 1916 it deployed again briefly to the Eastern Front before returning to the West and engaging in trench warfare in Lorraine (region). Here, in December 1916, the regiment was reinforced by a 2nd and 3rd MG company. 1917 saw the unit engaged during the battles of Arras, Passchendaele and Cambrai. At the start of the 1918 German Spring Offensive the fusiliers suffered heavy casualties at Beaumetz and subsequently formed itself into 2 battalions of 3 companies each. On 5 April the regiment was reorganised into 3 battalions again and joined on 14 September 1918 by a MW company.

Post-War 
Following the end of the war the regiment was demobilised on 14 December 1918 in Berlin and finally disbanded. Elements of it were used to form two Freikorps units that were later incorporated into the Provisional Reichswehr.

The regiment's tradition was transferred in the Reichswehr by a directive of the Chief of the General Staff (Chef der Heeresleitung), General of Infantry Hans von Seeckt, dated 24 August 1921, to the 7th and 8th companies of the 5th (Prussian) Infantry.

Commanders

See also
List of Imperial German infantry regiments

References

Literature 
 von der Mülbe: Das Garde-Füsilier-Regiment. Zweite Auflage. Verlag R. Eisenschmidt. Berlin 1901.
 Carl H. von der Schulenburg-Wolfsburg: Geschichte des Garde-Füsilier-Regiments. Erinnerungsblätter deutscher Regimenter (preuß. Anteil, Band 157). Oldenburg. Stalling. 1926.

Guards regiments of the Prussian Army
Fusilier regiments